"River Song" is a song composed by Robert B. Sherman and Richard M. Sherman in 1973. It was sung by Charley Pride in the musical motion picture Tom Sawyer.  The song score received a Christopher Award and a nomination for an Academy Award.  The song's placement as a "bookend" piece to the motion picture was largely due to the Sherman Brothers' deep involvement with the film, including screenwriters as well as songwriters.  The song is featured on the popular music LP, The Brady Bunch Phonographic Album which features a total of three Sherman Brothers songs including "River Song."

Inspired by Twain
The Shermans did not know how they would end their screenplay until reading Twain's own conclusion to the book.  According to Robert B. Sherman, the "River Song" was inspired by the last page of Mark Twain's book in which Twain writes: "So endeth this chronicle. It being strictly a history of a boy, it must stop here; the story could not go much further without becoming the history of a man. When one writes a novel about grown people, he knows exactly where to stop -- that is, with a marriage; but when he writes of juveniles, he must stop where he best can."  The song reflects this with the lyrics "The boy is gonna grow to a man, to a man/Only once in his life is he free/Only one golden time in his life is he free."   The song is used to begin and end the movie, and is set against footage of the Mississippi River, showing Tom running toward the river, alongside it, swimming in it, etc.  Thus both the song and the footage reinforce the metaphor of the boy as a force of nature (i.e., like the river), and also takes inspiration from the opening paragraphs of Twain's semi-autobiographical novel Life on the Mississippi.

Songs written by the Sherman Brothers
1973 singles
Music based on novels
Songs about the United States
Songs about rivers